Francisco Luis Monárrez Rincón (born 5 August 1950) is a Mexican politician affiliated with the Institutional Revolutionary Party. As of 2014 he served as Deputy of the LIX Legislature of the Mexican Congress representing Durango.

References

1950 births
Living people
Politicians from Durango
Institutional Revolutionary Party politicians
21st-century Mexican politicians
Deputies of the LIX Legislature of Mexico
Members of the Chamber of Deputies (Mexico) for Durango